Craugastor glaucus is a species of frog in the family Craugastoridae.
It is endemic to the Chiapas Highlands of southern Mexico.
Its natural habitat is subtropical or tropical moist montane forest.
It is threatened by habitat loss.

References

glaucus
Amphibians described in 1967
Taxonomy articles created by Polbot
Central American pine–oak forests
Chiapas Highlands